Bernd Eistert (9 November 1902 – 22 May 1978) was a German chemist. Together with Fritz Arndt he discovered the Arndt-Eistert synthesis.

Life

Eistert was born in Ohlau (Oława), Prussian Silesia. After he received his PhD in Breslau in 1927 for his work with Fritz Arndt he worked for the BASF company from 1929 till 1943. He worked at the Technical University of Darmstadt from 1943 till 1957 when he changed to the University of Saarbrücken, where he retired in 1971.

References

1902 births
1978 deaths
20th-century German chemists
People from the Province of Silesia
University of Breslau alumni
People from Oława
BASF people
Academic staff of Technische Universität Darmstadt